Shore Road Estates is an unincorporated community located within Monroe Township in Middlesex County, New Jersey, United States.

References

Monroe Township, Middlesex County, New Jersey
Unincorporated communities in Middlesex County, New Jersey
Unincorporated communities in New Jersey